John Hunter Prentice (19 October 1898 – 28 June 1966) was a Scottish footballer who played as an forward. Born in Glasgow, he lived in Manchester from an early age and played football in the Manchester amateur leagues before being signed by Manchester United, initially as an amateur. He turned professional in November 1919, although it was not until 2 April 1920 that he made his debut, starting at outside left in a 1–0 home defeat to Bradford Park Avenue. That turned out to be his only appearance for Manchester United, as he rejected the terms of their contract offer ahead of the 1920–21 season and signed instead for Swansea Town. Again, he found first-team football difficult to come by, playing just three times in Swansea's Third Division campaign, and he joined Tranmere Rovers for the 1921–22 season. There, he made 23 appearances and scored three goals in the Third Division, adding a further two goals in the FA Cup. He was released at the end of the season and replaced by another former Manchester United outside left, James Robinson.

Bibliography

References

External links
Profile at StretfordEnd.co.uk

1898 births
1966 deaths
Scottish footballers
Manchester United F.C. players
Swansea City A.F.C. players
Tranmere Rovers F.C. players
Association football forwards